Plesiothele is a monotypic genus of Australian funnel-web spiders containing the single species, Plesiothele fentoni. It was first described by Robert John Raven in 1978, and has only been found in Australia. Originally placed with the curtain web spiders, it was moved to the Hexathelidae in 1980.

References

Endemic fauna of Tasmania
Hexathelidae
Monotypic Mygalomorphae genera
Mygalomorphae genera
Spiders of Australia